Przemysław Kita (born 19 October 1993) is a Polish professional footballer who plays as a striker for II liga club Radunia Stężyca.

Career

Kita started his career with Włókniarz Pabianice.

External links
 
 
 Profile at Znicz Pruszków

References

1993 births
Living people
Association football forwards
Polish footballers
Ekstraklasa players
I liga players
II liga players
ŁKS Łódź players
MKS Cracovia (football) players
Znicz Pruszków players
Warta Poznań players
Olimpia Grudziądz players
Widzew Łódź players
People from Pabianice
Sportspeople from Łódź Voivodeship